I Am More than a Wolf Whistle: The Story of Carolyn Bryant Donham is a memoir by American author Carolyn Bryant Donham, the white woman who accused the African-American 14-year-old Emmett Till of offending her at her store in 1955, directly causing lynching. Written before 2008, the manuscript was originally planned for a 2036 posthumous release, but leaked by historian Timothy Tyson and released to the public in July 2022. The book received a decidedly negative response.

Background and release
 
Emmitt Till, a 14-year old African-American resident of Chicago, visited relatives in Mississippi in 1955. He visited a grocery store called Bryant's Grocery, which was owned by Donham and her husband Roy Bryant, both of whom were white. Till offended Donham in some way, though accounts of the events differ. After hearing about the interaction, Donham's husband Roy and Roy's half-brother John William "J. W." Milam, with her assistance, kidnapped, tortured, and lynched Till.

The book was dictated by Donham to her daughter-in-law Marsha Bryant, who transcribed the recollections. The manuscript is also dedicated to Marsha. The public first learned of the book when historian Timothy Tyson interviewed Donham in 2008. Donham made an agreement with Tyson during the interview process that the book would not be released until 2036. She gave a copy of the book to Tyson, who in turn gave it to the Southern Historical Collection at the University of North Carolina, where it was held in their archives. Till's cousin and civil rights activist Deborah Watts called for the release of the manuscript in 2021 in an op-ed for USA Today, hoping its release would lead to Donham's indictment.

In July 2022, an unserved arrest warrant for Donham was found by the Emmett Till Legacy Foundation in a Mississippi County Courthouse basement. The discovery led to renewed calls for her arrest, which gained traction and coverage. Tyson released a copy of the manuscript to the FBI and subsequently to newspaper outlets, saying "The potential for an investigation was more important than the archival agreements, though those are important things. But this is probably the last chance for an indictment in this case." After the release of the manuscript, Tyson said he has not spoken to Donham since the interview in 2008. Donham was 88 years old at the time of the book's release. Journalist Stacey Patton from NewsOne, a division of Urban One, first broke the story of the manuscript, which quickly spread; PDFs were subsequently posted online.

Content
The 99-page manuscript focuses on two main aspects of Donham's life. The first third of the book focuses on her early life in the South, including her childhood being raised on the Archer Plantation outside of Cruger, Mississippi. Donham recalls her "hired help" Annie Freeman, whom she said she loved, recounting Freeman had skin "the color of hot chocolate". The recollections continue with Donham's boyfriend at the time showing her a "hanging tree", which Donham remembered would be a "terrific tree to climb" if she were a tomboy. The last two-thirds of the book focus on the interaction, aftermath, trial, and subsequent developments of the Till events. The book ends with the paragraph:

Reception and response
The book received an overwhelmingly negative response, with a number of writers and historians noting the inconsistencies, historical revisionism, and lack of contrition by Donham. Jerry Mitchell from the Mississippi Center For Investigative Reporting pointed out a number of inconsistencies in the book, writing in his article for The Boston Globe that Donham "conjures the 'black beast rapist' mythology".

Natasha Decker from MadameNoire said the memoir contained "shocking new information... but not one of thorough confession, self-accountability, or guilt." Author and historian Chris Benson, who co-wrote the book A Few Days Full of Trouble on Till's lynching, said Donham's book has "several key contradictions" and the public will likely be "outraged" by her unrepentance. NewsOne's Patton labeled Donham a racist and additionally wrote:

Filmmaker Keith Beauchamp, who directed the documentary The Untold Story of Emmett Louis Till, said "I'm totally disturbed and outraged by what I've read. This so-called memoir gives us further proof of Carolyn Bryant's culpability in the kidnapping and murder of Emmett Till." Online magazine Bossip wrote the book was a "malevolent manifesto" and called for Donham to be jailed. Journalist Charles M. Blow wrote an op-ed for the New York Times in which he lambasted Donham and the memoir, writing, "She has failed at every turn to offer a redeeming word or action for the boy's murder and her part in it. The words we've seen in this memoir don't cut it."

Aftermath
Shortly after the memoir was leaked, an attempt was made to indict Donham on charges of kidnapping and manslaughter. On August 9, 2022, after hearing more than seven hours of testimony from investigators and witnesses, a grand jury in Mississippi declined to indict Donham.

References

American non-fiction books
English-language books
Emmett Till
Non-fiction books about murders in the United States
Anti-black racism in the United States
False allegations of sex crimes